Josip Takač (11 November 1919 – 1991) was a Yugoslav footballer.

Club career
Born in Subotica, Takač started playing in 1933 with local ŽAK Subotica. In 1937 he moved to Novi Sad where he joined UTK (Újvidéki Textil SK) a regular competitor in the first league of the Novi Sad Football Subassociation. With Second World War already started and the region occupied by Hungarian authorities, he joins Újvidékí AC in June 1942, the local club that was playing in the Nemzeti Bajnokság I. He played 3 seasons in Hungarian top level. However, in 1944 the season was interrupted as Hungary was losing the war, and Takač left UTC and Novi Sad and returned to his hometown, Subotica, where he rejoined his former team ŽAK.

As the region came back to Yugoslav authorities, ŽAK was merged with other local clubs and formed FK Spartak Subotica in 1945. Takač will become one of its most influential players, and his skills got him to join powerhouse Red Star Belgrade in 1948. In 1950 he will return to Subotica and rejoin Spartak. He will finish his playing career in 1962. During his club career, he won 3 Yugoslav Cup titles.

International career
Takač will be the member of the Yugoslav team that won silver at the 1948 Summer Olympics, but he did not play in any matches.

Coaching career
Later he became a coach and managed Bačka Bačka Palanka and other clubs.

References

1919 births
1991 deaths
Sportspeople from Subotica
Hungarians in Vojvodina
Yugoslav footballers
Serbian footballers
Hungarian footballers
Association football midfielders
ŽAK Subotica players
NAK Novi Sad players
Nemzeti Bajnokság I players
FK Spartak Subotica players
Red Star Belgrade footballers
Yugoslav First League players
Yugoslav football managers
Serbian football managers
FK Sutjeska Nikšić managers